The Roman Catholic Diocese of Alto Solimões is a diocese located in the city of Tabatinga in the Ecclesiastical province of Manaus in Brazil.

History
 May 23, 1910: Established as Apostolic Prefecture of Alto Solimões from the Diocese of Amazonas
 August 11, 1950: Promoted as Territorial Prelature of Alto Solimões
 August 14, 1991: Promoted as Diocese of Alto Solimões

Bishops
 Prefects apostolic of Alto Solimões (Latin Church) 
Evangelista Galea (6 Sep 1910 – 1938)
Tomaz M. de Marcellano (1938 – 1945)
Venceslao da Spoleto (8 Nov 1946 – 1950)
Wesceslau Nazareno Ponte de Spoleto (Apostolic Administrator 4 Sep 1950 – 1952)
 Prelates of Alto Solimões (Latin Church) 
 Wesceslau Nazareno Ponte de Spoleto (1952 – 1952)
 Cesário Alexandre Minali (1 Mar 1955  – 9 Apr 1958), appointed Prelate of Carolina, Maranhão
 Adalberto Domingos Marzi (Apostolic administrator 8 Apr 1959  – 4 Feb 1961)
 Adalberto Domingos Marzi (4 Feb 1961  – 12 Sep 1990)
 Bishops of Alto Solimões (Latin Church)
 Evangelista Alcimar Caldas Magalhães (12 Sep 1990  – 20 May 2015)
 Adolfo Zon Pereira, S.X. (20 May 2015 - present)

Coadjutor bishop
Adolfo Zon Pereira, S.X. (2014-2015)

References
 Catholic Hierarchy.org: Roman Catholic Diocese of Alto Solimões

Alto Solimoes
Amazonas (Brazilian state)
Tres Fronteras
Roman Catholic Ecclesiastical Province of Manaus
1910 establishments in Brazil
Christian organizations established in 1910
Alto Solimoes